The European System Providing Refueling Infrastructure and Telecommunications (ESPRIT) is a planned module of the Lunar Gateway. It will provide refueling through additional xenon and hydrazine capacity for use in the Power and Propulsion Element's ion engines and hydrazine thrusters. It will also provide additional communications equipment, a habitation area, and storage. ESA awarded two parallel design studies for ESPRIT, one mostly led by Airbus in partnership with Comex and OHB and one led by Thales Alenia Space. The construction of the module was approved in November 2019. On 14 October 2020, Thales Alenia Space announced that they had been selected by ESA to build the ESPRIT module.

The module is currently slated to launch as a co-manifested payload on Artemis 5 in 2029. 1.5 tons of cargo will be packed inside the module for launch.

Configuration 
The ESPRIT module will consist of two parts, the Halo Lunar Communication System (HLCS) and the ESPRIT Refueling Module (ERM).

Halo Lunar Communication System (HLCS) 
The Halo Lunar Communication System (HLCS) will provide communications for the station, allowing it to transmit data to and receive data from other spacecraft on and around the Moon. It will launch in 2024 pre-attached to the HALO module, for which Thales has separately been awarded a contract by NASA to construct its hull and micrometeoroid protection. These will allow HLCS to achieve a data rate of up to 25Mbps.

Because of its two dishes, the system will be able to communicate with two different targets (including spacecraft landing on the Moon or operating around Gateway) at once in S- or K-band radio frequencies.

ESPRIT Refueling Module (ERM) 
 
The ESPRIT Refueling Module (ERM) will contain the propellant tanks, docking ports, and a small windowed habitation corridor. The interior of the module will primarily be used for storage, although it will feature one workstation for astronaut use and six windows. The workstation and windows will be useful for photographing the lunar surface, controlling Canadarm3, and monitoring docking spacecraft. The module features two docking ports, meaning that once it docks to the HALO module, resupply craft and other vessels can dock to ESPRIT. These can include future propellant tankers to further refuel Gateway if needed. The ERM also features batteries and small surface-mounted solar panels to power the module on its way to the Moon.

A small science airlock was planned for the module during early designs in order to transfer scientific payloads outside the Gateway, but recent designs lack the airlock.

The ERM is scheduled to launch on an SLS Block 1B launch vehicle in 2029, along with Artemis 5. Packed inside the module will be approximately 1.5 tons of cargo for ESPRIT and Gateway operations. Orion will dock to ESPRIT following launch and deliver it to Gateway.

See also 

 Power and Propulsion Element, a core module of the Gateway that will power ESPRIT once docked and maintain the station's orbit
 Habitation and Logistics Outpost, the first habitation module of Gateway, featuring the port that ESPRIT will dock to
 International Habitation Module, the second habitable module of Gateway

References 

Lunar Gateway
2020s in spaceflight